Matt Trobbiani is an Australian video game developer who developed the indie video game Hacknet. His experience as a developer were the subject of a profile in Rolling Stone in 2016.

Biography 
Trobbiani received a Computer Science degree at the University of Adelaide. He went on to develop Hacknet as an indie developer and posted an unfinished version of it on IndieDB in 2012, where it gave the site its highest day of traffic in its history. Despite this, he was unsure of the game's prospects for success, believing that people only downloaded it because it was free. However, he borrowed $10,000 AUD to finish the game, taking an advance to cover the marketing costs. When it released on Steam in 2015, it garnered a large number of sales, ultimately selling 100,000 copies four months after release and making him "rich" by indie game developer standards. He was able to make back the cost of development after years of being frugal with his money, earning the equivalent of a six-figure salary for the years he spent on the game, despite still living in the same house with his siblings where he developed it.

Trobbiani stated that, in Hacknet, he wanted to make the player the one who was making decisions, without any avatar separating them from the game.

References 

Living people
Australian video game designers
Year of birth missing (living people)